Félix Arvers (July 23, 1806 – November 7, 1850) was a French poet and dramatist, most famous for his poem Un secret.

Born in Paris, Arvers abandoned his law career aged 30 to concentrate on theatre. His plays gained moderate success in their own time, but none were as notorious as Un Secret, dedicated to Marie, the daughter of writer Charles Nodier. This poem was taken from a piece he wrote aged 25, Mes heures perdues (My lost hours).

Felix Arvers found no way to express his unrequited love and alleviate  his pain, he had no way but confide his feelings in a sonnet. The poem was so heart-rending and struck such a success and popularity with its powerful romantic description of profound feelings among the frequenters of the Paris literary salons that it was circulated for recite among them for years before becoming a classic of French romantic poetry after his death.

Un secret was the only well-known poem in his oeuvre titled Mes heures perdues, Félix Arvers was referred to in French literature as "The Poet of a single poem." The sonnet is also known around the world as the Sonnet d'Arvers:

Mon âme a son secret, ma vie a son mystère
Un amour éternel en un moment conçu:
Le mal est sans espoir, aussi j'ai dû le taire,
Et celle qui l'a fait n'en a jamais rien su.

Hélas! j'aurai passé près d'elle inaperçu,
Toujours à ses côtés et pourtant solitaire;
Et j'aurai jusqu'au bout fait mon temps sur la terre,
N'osant rien demander et n'ayant rien reçu.

Pour elle, quoique Dieu l'ait faite douce et tendre,
Elle suit son chemin, distraite et sans entendre
Ce murmure d'amour élevé sur ses pas.

A l'austère devoir pieusement fidèle,
Elle dira, lisant ces vers tout remplis d'elle:
"Quelle est donc cette femme ?" Et ne comprendra pas! 

My Secret

My soul its secret has, my life too has its mystery,
A love eternal in a moment's space conceived;
Hopeless the evil is, I have not told its history,
And the one who was the cause nor knew it nor believed.

Alas! I shall have passed close by her unperceived,
Forever at her side, and yet forever lonely,
I shall unto the end have made life's journey, only
Daring to ask for naught, and having naught received.

For her, though God has made her gentle and endearing,
She will go on her way distraught and without hearing
These murmurings of love that round her steps ascend.

Piously faithful still unto her austere duty,
She will say, when she shall read these lines full of her beauty,
"Who can this woman be?" and will not comprehend.

--translated by Henry Wadsworth Longfellow

19th-century French poets
1806 births
1850 deaths
French male poets
19th-century French male writers